Circeaster is a genus of abyssal sea stars in the family Goniasteridae.

Habitat and distribution 
These sea stars have a flattened and broad pentagonal central disc, with 5 tapering arm. The marginal plates are thick and well delimited.

They live between 320 and 3000 meters deep, in the three main oceanic basins.

Species list
According to World Register of Marine Species: 
 Circeaster americanus (A.H. Clark, 1916)
 Circeaster arandae Mah, 2006
 Circeaster helenae Mah, 2006
 Circeaster kristinae Mah, 2006
 Circeaster loisetteae Mah, 2006
 Circeaster magdalenae Koehler, 1909
 Circeaster marcelli Koehler, 1909
 Circeaster pullus Mah, 2006
 Circeaster sandrae Mah, 2006

References

External links

 Mah, C. (2014), Circeaster Koehler, 1909 In: Mah, C.L. (2014) World Asteroidea database. Accessed through: World Register of Marine Species.
 Mah, C.L. (2006), "Phylogenetic analysis and biogeography of the deep-sea goniasterid, Circeaster (Echinodermata: Asteroidea) including descriptions of six new species", Zoosystema, 28(4): 917-954.

Goniasteridae